Eerie Von (born Eric Stellmann; August 25, 1964) is an American musician best known as the original bassist for the heavy metal band Danzig. His preferred bass is the Fender Jazz Bass.

Early life 
Eerie Von was raised in Lodi, New Jersey. As a child he gained an interest in drawing and art. He grew up listening mostly to Elvis Presley and 50s rock and roll music. Eerie Von began playing the drums and taking lessons at 8 years old. He attended Lodi High School with future Misfits guitarist Doyle, who introduced Eerie Von to the punk rock music of the Misfits. It was in high school that he assumed "Eerie" as his nickname.

Career

Rosemary's Babies and Misfits 
Eerie Von became interested in photography in 1978. He would later strike a friendship with Glenn Danzig and the Misfits, becoming the band's photographer in 1981. Eerie Von was the drummer for the hardcore punk band Rosemary's Babies from 1980 to 1983, recording drums on the Blood Lust EP and the Talking to the Dead compilation album. Eerie Von was once asked to join the Misfits as a drummer, but declined, choosing to remain with Rosemary's Babies. Although never an official Misfits member, in 1986 Eerie Von performed bass and drums on several tracks which eventually appeared on the band's Collection II compilation album in 1995. Eerie Von's close association with the Misfits led to him providing the liner notes to the Misfits box set in 1996.

Samhain and Danzig 
After the Misfits broke up, Eerie Von and Glenn Danzig discussed forming a new band and began rehearsing together. This would lead to Eerie Von becoming the original drummer for Danzig's band Samhain, before quickly switching to bass guitar after being shown how to play the songs by Glenn Danzig. He remained with Samhain from 1983 to 1987, recording on the albums Initium, November-Coming-Fire and Final Descent, and also the Unholy Passion EP. Samhain then changed their name to Danzig, who he played bass with from 1987 to July 1995, appearing on the albums Danzig, Lucifuge, How the Gods Kill and 4, and also the Thrall-Demonsweatlive EP.

Solo 
Eerie Von currently works as a solo performer. He released the instrumental album Uneasy Listening in 1996. He followed this with two gothic rock albums, 1999s The Blood and the Body and 2004s Bad Dream No.13. In 2006, he released the punk rock album That's All There Is. The dark country-style album Kinda Country followed in 2009. Eerie Von also formed the short-lived blues rock band, Bighouse, along with former Danzig soundman Rick Dittamo. Eerie Von has had much underground success with his "Fiend Art", which showcases his disturbing themes on canvas. Misery Obscura, a book compiling photographs taken by Eerie Von throughout his career, was released in 2009. In January 2010, Eerie Von performed an acoustic set at Generation Records in New York City with Lyle Preslar and Mike D'Antonio in support of Misery Obscura. Eerie Von was the co-host for Under the Gun with Candy Gunn, a weekly radio show broadcast on Radio Free Nashville, from its inception in 2012 until July 2013. Eerie Von is currently planning to release a new book and documentary, both titled Misery Perfectum, and he is working on a sixth solo album.

Discography

Rosemary's Babies 
 1983: Blood Lust EP
 2004: Talking to the Dead

Misfits 
 1995: Collection II (Some songs either featured overdubs by, or were entirely recorded by, Glenn Danzig and Eerie Von)
 1996: Misfits Box Set

Samhain 
 1984: Initium
 1985: Unholy Passion EP
 1986: November-Coming-Fire
 1990: Final Descent
 2000: Samhain Box Set
 2002: Samhain Live '85–'86 Danzig 
 1988: Danzig 1990: Danzig II: Lucifuge 1992: Danzig III: How the Gods Kill 1993: Thrall-Demonsweatlive 1994: Danzig 4 2001: Live on the Black Hand Side 2007: The Lost Tracks of Danzig Solo 
 1996: Uneasy Listening (with Mike Morance)
 1999: The Blood and the Body 2004: Bad Dream No.13 2006: That's All There Is (as SpiderCider)
 2009: Kinda Country Others 
 1998: The Black Bible by Various Artists (Contributed the track "Cinerarium Waltz")
 2000: The Darkest Millennium (A Gothic, Industrial, and Synth Pop Collection) by Various Artists (Contributed the track "An Investment in Hate")
 2000: Darken My Fire: A Gothic Tribute To The Doors by Various Artists (Contributed the track "The Spy")
 2001: Darker Shade of Goth by Various Artists (Contributed disc one)
 2005: Pledge Your Allegiance...To Satan!'' by Various Artists (Contributed the track "The Bone Drone")

References

External links 
Eerie Von's official website
Eerie Von's Fiend Art
Ghastly Records

1964 births
Living people
American punk rock bass guitarists
American male bass guitarists
Horror punk musicians
Danzig (band) members
People from Lodi, New Jersey
American people of German descent
Guitarists from New Jersey
American male guitarists
Samhain (band) members
20th-century American guitarists